Luka Novak (1963) is a Slovenian author, publisher, TV personality and intellectual property expert. He founded Vale-Novak and Totaliteta Publishers. He was the director of the Slovenian Intellectual Property Office and is the Chairman of the Board of SAZOR, the Slovenian Organization of Authors and Publishers for Reproduction Rights.

Author and Publisher 
His work is published by Totaliteta Publications in Ljubljana, Guernica Editions in Toronto and by Editions Léo Scheer in France. His book Le Métro, Inconscient urbain, a psychogeographical analysis of public transport in Paris, New York and Tokyo, received reviews in French media such as Le Monde and  France Culture. His book Phénoménologie de la mayonnaise, a historical, anthropological and philosophical analysis of gastronomy, was written in French and published in 2018 by Editions Léo Scheer. The book came out in an updated Slovenian edition under the title Polje gastronomije: od racionalizma prek absolutizma do družabnih omrežij (The Gastronomic Field: From Rationalism and Absolutism to Social Media) and was nominated for the Rožanc Prize for best essay in 2019. The French version of the book was part of an exhibition on French eating habits through photography, staged in Marseille's Mucem in 2018, stressing the role of social media in the development of the representation of food.

As a publisher at Vale-Novak and Totaliteta Publications, Luka Novak published, edited or translated over 300 Slovenian publications, ranging from literary authors such as Julian Barnes, Paul Auster and Hanif Kureishi to upmarket commercial writers like Paulo Coelho, Alain de Botton and Madonna. He also translated and published numerous cuisine titles, featuring authors such as Gordon Ramsay, Jamie Oliver and Anthony Bourdain. His recent publications and translations include mathematician Cédric Villani, philosopher Slavoj Žižek and historian Timothy Snyder.

Education 
He studied Comparative Literature, French, Italian and Romance Philology (Universities of Ljubljana, Bonn, Tübingen, 1989–1993). He has degrees in Comparative Literature (1987), French and Italian Philology (1992), and obtained an MBA in 1997 (IEDC Bled School of Management, 1997).  He was a visiting scholar at the University of Tübingen and attended publishing and strategy courses at Stanford University.

Media career 
Luka Novak is a Slovenian TV personality and has co-written and co-hosted (with his wife Valentina Smej Novak) 120 episodes of gastronomical and lifestyle TV shows for various Slovenian TV channels (POP TV, Planet TV). The shows reached considerable audience shares and were followed by the publication of several best-selling cookbooks (2009-2017).

Luka Novak is involved in the making of a major national TV campaign promoting Slovenian literature called 50 knjig, ki so nas napisale (The 50 Books That Shaped Slovenia) where he is the co-author (with his wife Valentina Smej Novak) and presenter of fifty eight-minute documentary TV episodes depicting and assessing the role of the most important books that contributed to the development and formation of Slovenia as a nation. The series is conceived as a fresh approach to classical topics and is aired weekly by the Channel 1 of the Slovenian National TV. It features interviews with scholars, intellectuals and celebrities, using infographics, animation and archive materials to communicate information to a general audience. The campaign is backed by an extensive awareness campaign on social media.

Intellectual Property Expert 
Luka Novak was the director of the Slovenian Intellectual Property Office. He is the director of SAZOR, the Slovenian Organisation of Authors and Publishers for Reproduction Rights. He is involved in copyright awareness campaigns on European level, speaks at various national and international conferences on copyright law and collective management issues, and writes for the leading Slovenian legal practice magazine Pravna Praksa.

Publications (Literature and Essays) 

Kitsch and Music in Milan Kundera, essay, Ljubljana 1985
Let’s Skip Postmodernism, essay, Ljubljana 1986
Stereotype (feature film, with director Damjan Kozole), 1997
The Vatican in Ecstasy of Communication, essay on Pope Wojtyla's philosophy, Ljubljana, 2005
The Golden Shower or What Men Want, novel, Ljubljana 2008, Toronto 2012
The Feeling of Spring in Litzirüti, novel, Ljubljana 2012
Love at First Bite 1 and 2 (Contemporary Family Cooking, w Valentina Smej Novak), Ljubljana 2009, 2010
Simply Slovenian (Modern Slovenian Cookery), Ljubljana 2011
Ku-Ku Venice, a Cultural and Culinary Guide, Ljubljana 2011
Le Métro, Inconscient urbain, Paris 2017
Phénoménologie de la mayonnaise, Paris 2018
Polje gastronomije, od racionalizma prek absolutizma do družabnih omrežij, Ljubljana 2019

Academic Publications (Intellectual Property and Copyright Issues) 
Educational Exceptions in the EU Directive on Copyright in the Digital Single Market, Ljubljana 2019

Private Copy and Other Private Uses of Copyrighted Material: An Overview of Legal Frameworks From the Berne Convention to National Laws, Ljubljana 2019

The Copyright Issues of Digitalising Universal Book Heritage, Ljubljana 2019

Awards 
Chevalier de l'Ordre des Arts et des Lettres by the French Minister of Culture in 2018.

Cavaliere dell'Ordine della Stella d'Italia by the President of the Italian Republic in 2019.

Shortlisted for the Rožanc Award, the Slovenian prize for best essay in 2019.

References

Slovenian television personalities
Slovenian writers
Living people
Slovenian publishers (people)
1963 births